Jacob Maliekal (born 1 January 1991) is a male badminton player from South Africa. He became the South Africa national team members in 2009 and won gold medals at the 2011 and 2014 African Games in badminton men's singles event. He competed at the 2016 Summer Olympics held in Rio de Janeiro, Brazil.

He was one of the 14 players selected for the Road to Rio Program, a program that aimed to help African badminton players to compete at the 2016 Summer Olympics.

Achievements

All-Africa Games
Men's singles

African Championships
Men's singles

BWF International Challenge/Series
Men's singles

Men's doubles

 BWF International Challenge tournament
 BWF International Series tournament
 BWF Future Series tournament

References

External links
 
 
 
 
 
 

1991 births
Living people
People from Mthatha
South African male badminton players
Badminton players at the 2016 Summer Olympics
Olympic badminton players of South Africa
Badminton players at the 2014 Commonwealth Games
Commonwealth Games competitors for South Africa
Competitors at the 2011 All-Africa Games
Competitors at the 2015 African Games
African Games gold medalists for South Africa
African Games silver medalists for South Africa
African Games medalists in badminton
Sportspeople from the Eastern Cape
Alumni of Selborne College